Six Degrees of Martina McBride was a two-hour TV special/pilot that aired on July 30, 2007 on ABC in which six aspiring country singers from America's smallest towns tried to connect themselves to Martina McBride in six or fewer points of human connection. The program tested the "six degrees of separation" phenomenon. Those who made it from "Nowhere to Nashville to New York" got both a studio session with McBride and a shot at a record deal with Sony BMG. ABC did not pick up the pilot as a series.

Production
The show also told McBride's own unique story of six degrees, which helped advance her from selling T-shirts for Garth Brooks, to opening for him on stage, to becoming one of country-and-western music's biggest superstars. Rodney Atkins, Ray Benson, Little Big Town, and Miranda Lambert appeared in the show.

The pilot program was produced for the ABC Television Network by the production team of ABC News Primetime, and was the first of its kind. On July 27, 2007, executive producer David Sloan described the show as a "hybrid" to the Chicago Tribune: "ABC News is looking for new ways of interacting and engaging with the viewer. This represents that effort."

The show aired on July 30, 2007 as an entire season compressed into one two-hour broadcast. 

DeAnne Roberts won the final competition. Thomas Stratton and Kristina Craig were the other two finalists. ABC-TV did not pick up the program's series option.

On August 1, 2007, Sony BMG released all three finalists' singles digitally on iTunes.

Cast and crew
The show was hosted by Jay Schadler.

Contestants
The six contestants were:
Mark Jaspers
Thomas Stratton
Dani Riker
Kristina Marie Craig
DeAnne Roberts
Ken Swick

Judges
The contestants faced three judges:
Miranda Lambert
Ray Benson 
Beverly Keel

References

External links
Media Bistro article
Martina McBride's official website

2000s American television specials
American music television series
2000s American reality television series
ABC News
Television pilots not picked up as a series